Period Pains were a British all-female indie punk band formed in 1996. They gained attention in 1997 after releasing the single "Spice Girls (Who Do You Think You Are?)". They then recorded a session for John Peel, which was subsequently released as an EP. 

They opened the Reading Festival in 1997 on the Dr. Marten's Stage.

Chloe Alper went on to co-found Pure Reason Revolution. Felicity Aldridge moved into film production working for the acclaimed Director/Producer, Nick Weschler.

Spice Girls (Who Do You Think You Are?)

The band achieved notoriety in 1997 after releasing the single "Spice Girls (Who Do You Think You Are?)", a play on the Spice Girls' single title.  The track was an attack on what they saw as the Spice Girls' shallow attitudes, and was heavily plugged by John Peel and Steve Lamacq on BBC Radio 1. The UK's tabloid newspapers also picked up on the band. As a result, it made the UK Singles Chart at number 87 in late August 1997 with practically no advertising, and was number 4 in Peel's annual end-of-year Festive Fifty.

Charts

Discography

Singles and EPs
"Spice Girls (Who Do You Think You Are?" (Damaged Goods, 1997) [#87, UK Singles Chart], condensed chart (3-track single) 
BBC Sessions (Damaged Goods, 1997) (5-track Peel Session EP)

Compilation Appearances
"Daddy, I Want a Pony" on And The Rest Is History (Zerox, 1997) (LP/CD compilation inc. Kenickie, Helen Love, Symposium, Midget, Bellatrix, Disco Pistol, etc.)

References

External links
Band page at Damaged Goods

All-female punk bands
English indie rock groups
Riot grrrl bands